Ragged Mountain may refer to:

Summits 
 Ragged Mountain (Connecticut)
 Ragged Mountain (New Hampshire)
 Ragged Mountain (Utah)
 Ragged Mountain (Virginia) in the Shenandoah Mountains
 Ragged Mountain, Berkshire County, Massachusetts, subordinate peak of Mount Greylock
Ragged Peak (Yosemite National Park)

See also 
Ragged Mountain Resort, skiing facility on the New Hampshire mountain